Alvord Lake is an urban fishing lake located in Cesar Chavez Park in Laveen, Arizona, at the southwest corner of 35th Avenue and Baseline Road.

Alvord Lake was part of a parcel of land willed to the city of Phoenix, Arizona by Gilbert Alvord.  Alvord was the sole heir to the Edgar Apperson fortune.  They made their home together in Phoenix, Arizona.

Fish species
 Urban fishing license is no longer needed, as long as you have a general fishing license, you can fish in any of the 36 "community fishing lakes"
 Largemouth bass
 Sunfish
 Catfish (channel)
 Rainbow Trout  stocked by AZGFD. See Stocking Schedule

References

Further reading
 Carp.

External links

Reservoirs in Arizona
Reservoirs in Maricopa County, Arizona